John Bouvier Kennedy Schlossberg (born January 19, 1993) is an American lawyer and son of U.S. Ambassador to Australia Caroline Kennedy. He is the only grandson of John F. Kennedy, the 35th President of the United States, and former first lady Jacqueline Bouvier Kennedy. He graduated from Yale University in 2015, and from Harvard Law School and Harvard Business School in 2022.

Early life and education
John Bouvier Kennedy Schlossberg was born in New York City on January 19, 1993, the youngest of three children of Caroline Kennedy and Edwin Schlossberg. He was named after both his maternal grandfather, John F. Kennedy, and his maternal great-grandfather, John Vernou Bouvier III. Schlossberg has two older sisters, Rose and Tatiana. Schlossberg's father comes from an Orthodox Jewish family of Ukrainian descent, and his mother is a Catholic of Irish, French, Scottish, and English descent. Schlossberg was raised in his mother's religion, and he also observes Jewish traditions, holidays, and holy days. As the lone grandson of John and Jacqueline Kennedy, Schlossberg became the only surviving male descendant of JFK's immediate family after his maternal uncle, John F. Kennedy Jr., died in a plane crash in 1999.

In eighth grade, Schlossberg co-founded ReLight New York, a non-profit organization that raised more than $100,000 to install compact fluorescent lights in low-income housing developments. In 2011, he graduated from The Collegiate School on the Upper West Side of Manhattan. He was elected by his class to make a speech at the commencement ceremony. Schlossberg attended Yale University, graduating in 2015 with a degree in history with a focus on Japanese history. While there, Schlossberg wrote for the Yale Daily News and Yale Herald. He received emergency medical technician (EMT) training and worked a summer job removing toxic waste from polluted sites in Massachusetts. Schlossberg entered Harvard Law School in the fall of 2017. He was in the joint degree program of J.D. and M.B.A. from Harvard Law School and Harvard Business School. He received his Juris Doctor and Master of Business Administration Degrees in February 2022.

Career
In October 2015, after graduating from Yale, Schlossberg started working at Rakuten, Inc, a Japanese internet and e-commerce company, in Tokyo, Japan. He met Hiroshi Mikitani, the CEO of Rakuten, while visiting Sendai accompanying Caroline on duties.

In 2016, Schlossberg worked as a staff assistant in the Bureau of Oceans and International Environmental and Scientific Affairs, part of the U.S. Department of State and Suntory Holdings Limited, a Japanese brewing, distilling and beverage company.

Public appearances
In November 2013, Schlossberg attended the Medal of Freedom Award Dinner to commemorate the 50th anniversary of his grandfather's death where he introduced President Barack Obama. Schlossberg is a member of the John F. Kennedy Library New Frontier Award Committee, for which he has acted as the award presenter. He is on the committee of the Profile in Courage Award and was the host for the 2014 ceremony.

Schlossberg made several public appearances in Japan and the United States accompanying his mother Caroline on duties while she served as the U.S. Ambassador to Japan from 2013 to 2017. In May 2014, he and Caroline visited Fukushima Prefecture, Japan. On May 5, they toured Fukushima Daiichi Nuclear Power Plant wearing yellow helmets and white protective suits with their last names emblazoned on them. He said there, "I hope my peers, my generation in the United States will keep Fukushima in mind and understand that there is still work to be done and we can all do something to help." On April 10, 2016, he and Caroline greeted the then U.S. Secretary of State, John Kerry, who arrived at the Iwakuni Marine Corps Air Station in Yamaguchi Prefecture, Japan, to attend the G7 foreign ministers' meeting in Hiroshima prefecture.

In November 2017, Schlossberg presented the New Frontier Award to U.S. Congressman Carlos Curbelo (R-Fla.) and May Boeve, executive director of 350.org.

In August 2020, Schlossberg appeared with his mother on the second night of the 2020 Democratic National Convention, giving a speech entitled “We Lead from the Oval Office".

Acting
On May 11, 2018, Schlossberg made his acting debut as Officer Jack Hammer on the eighth-season finale of the television show Blue Bloods.

Personal life
In September 2012, when asked about his interest in a political career, 19-year-old Schlossberg said: "Politics definitely interests me. I'm most interested in public service." In 2017 he was named to the Vanity Fair "Best Dressed List".

References

External links
 Articles by Jack Schlossberg in The Yale Herald
 
 
 

1993 births
Living people
People from the Upper East Side
American people of Scottish descent
American people of English descent
American people of French descent
American people of Ukrainian-Jewish descent
American people of Irish descent
Bouvier family
Kennedy family
Male actors from New York City
Yale College alumni
Catholics from New York (state)
Harvard Law School alumni
Harvard Business School alumni